This is a list of notable restaurants in Hungary.

Restaurants in Hungary

Budapest
 Café Gerbeaud
 Gundel
 Náncsi Néni
 Onyx-Budapest’s first 2 star Michelin Guide restaurant

See also

 Hungarian cuisine
 List of companies of Hungary
 List of Hungarian dishes
 Lists of restaurants

References

Lists of companies of Hungary
Hungary